Burrawang may refer to:

The cycad plant species Macrozamia communis
Other species in the genus Macrozamia
Burrawang, New South Wales, Australia, a town named after the cycad